Devi Prasad Tripathi (29 November  1952 – 2 January 2020) was an Indian politician and General Secretary of the Nationalist Congress Party of India.

Early life
Devi Prasad Tripathi was born in Sultanpur Uttar Pradesh. As a student, Tripathi was president of Jawaharlal Nehru University Students' Union, and later taught at Allahabad University as a professor of politics.

Career

He was also the editor of the quarterly journal Think India.  He spoke Indian and several foreign languages, and lectured in a number of foreign universities.

Having become involved in politics at the age of sixteen, Tripathi became one of Prime Minister Rajiv Gandhi's aides.  He left the Congress Party, however, over his opposition to Sonia Gandhi, the President of the Party, becoming Prime Minister (because of her foreign origin).  He joined the Nationalist Congress Party in 1999, and reached the position of its General Secretary and chief spokesman.  He was responsible for negotiating over seat-sharing in Maharashtra.

References

1954 births
2020 deaths
Jawaharlal Nehru University alumni
Academic staff of the University of Allahabad
Nationalist Congress Party politicians from Uttar Pradesh
People from Sultanpur, Uttar Pradesh
Rajya Sabha members from Maharashtra
Indian National Congress politicians from Uttar Pradesh
Centre for Political Studies (CPS), Jawaharlal Nehru University
Nationalist Congress Party politicians from Maharashtra